Gillian Gregory is an English dancer and choreographer for stage and film.

Gregory is a patron of the theatre charity The Music Hall Guild of Great Britain and America.

She was born and raised in Shrewsbury, Shropshire.

External links
 
 

Year of birth missing (living people)
Living people
English choreographers
English female dancers
Modern dancers
Tony Award winners
People from Shrewsbury